Ochtendzwemmers  is a 2000 Dutch film directed by Nicole van Kilsdonk.

Plot
Every morning  a fixed group of people use the local swimming pool. None of the regulars know each other, only by sight. However, the police suspect that the swimmers are part of a criminal organisation, and one morning, conduct a raid on the pool. One of the main suspects is Loes, who takes her story to the detective, her story seems to resolve the whole thing, but then she is accused of being a racist.

Cast
Ricky Koole - Loes
Daniël Boissevain - Bing
Felix Burleson - Ampie Sylvester
Viggo Waas - Frankie
Adriaan Olree - Dhr. Te Bokkel
Tatum Dagelet - Tanja
Frank Lammers - Herman
Olga Zuiderhoek - Moeder Bakker
Edwin Jongejans - Chris de Vis
Josh Meyer - Kenneth

External links 
 

Dutch comedy-drama films
2000 films
2000s Dutch-language films